Matthias Kyburz (born 5 March 1990) is a Swiss orienteering competitor, junior world champion, European champion and multiple world champion. On 16 April 2020, Kyburz attained the world record in quickest time reaching 50km on a treadmill, in a time of 2:56:35, breaking the record held by Florian Neuschwander.

Career
He won the sprint distance at the 2012 World Orienteering Championships in Lausanne, ahead of Matthias Merz and Matthias Müller, his first international victory. Kyburz has since been an important competitor on the world stage, an all round orienteer with the ability to win any of the three individual orienteering disciplines. This has allowed him to win the Orienteering World Cup on five occasions: 2012, 2013, 2016, 2017 and 2018. For eleven years in a row (2008 to 2018) one of the two Swiss orienteers Matthias Kyburz or Daniel Hubmann has won the Orienteering World Cup.

Kyburz has won six World Orienteering Championships gold medals in five different disciplines: Sprint (2012, Lausanne), Sprint Relay (2014, Trentino), Knock Out Sprint (2022, Vejle), Relay (2015, Inverness) and Middle (2016, Strömstad and 2021, Doksy). He has also won European Orienteering Championships gold medals in five different disciplines: Relay (2012), Sprint Relay (2021), Sprint (2016 and 2018), Knock Out Sprint (2021), and Middle (2016 and 2018).

Kyburz has won eight World Games medals of which three were gold in Cali 2013, one of each color at The World Games 2017, and a gold and a silver in 2022.

Results

World Championship results

World Cup victories 

 (p) = pursuit

Personal life
His brother, Andreas Kyburz, is also an international orienteering competitor.

References

External links

1990 births
Living people
Swiss orienteers
Male orienteers
Foot orienteers
World Orienteering Championships medalists
World Games gold medalists
World Games silver medalists
World Games bronze medalists
Competitors at the 2013 World Games
Competitors at the 2017 World Games
World Games medalists in orienteering
20th-century Swiss people
21st-century Swiss people
Junior World Orienteering Championships medalists